is a 2006 Japanese romantic melodrama film directed by Shin Togashi and based on a novel by Yuka Murayama.

Film summary 
On the way to hospital to visit his father, art student Ayuta Ipponyari (Hayato Ichihara) spots and falls in love with a beautiful woman on the train. He hurriedly draws a sketch of her until she departs the train.

At hospital Ayuta is talking with his father when a new doctor enters the room and introduces herself as Dr. Haruhi Godo (Manami Konishi). Ayuta immediately recognises her as the beautiful woman from the train. He also learns that she's divorced and an older sister of his long-time girlfriend Natsuki Saito (Erika Sawajiri), who wants to be his bride.

Believing Haruhi is the One, Ayuta attempts to woo her into accepting his romantic interest, not realising that their emerging love triangle would carry lasting consequences for all involved.

Cast 

Hayato Ichihara - Ayuta Ipponyari
Manami Konishi - Dr. Haruhi Godo
Erika Sawajiri - Natsuki Saito
Tomokazu Miura - Shibusawa
Kazuma Suzuki - Hasegawa
Keiko Toda - Sachie Ipponyari
So Kitamura - Naoki Ipponyari

References

External links

2006 films
Films based on Japanese novels
Films directed by Shin Togashi
Japanese romance films
2000s Japanese films
2000s Japanese-language films